Cuon is a former commune in the Maine-et-Loire department in western France. On 1 January 2016, it was merged into the commune of Baugé-en-Anjou. Its population was 557 in 2019.

History
Cuon was the site of settlements during the Neolithic and Gallo-Roman periods. It was a seigneurie and parish in the eleventh century.

Sights
 Menhir de Pierrefitte
 Château de La Graffinière (fifteenth century), restored during the nineteenth and twentieth centuries
 Old manors (farms) of Cussé, Vaux, La Genneveselière (sixteenth century)

See also
Communes of the Maine-et-Loire department

References

Former communes of Maine-et-Loire